

MS-DOS Editor, commonly just called edit or edit.com, is a TUI text editor that comes with MS-DOS 5.0 and later, as well as all "x86" SKUs of Windows, until Windows 11. It supersedes edlin, the standard editor in earlier versions of MS-DOS. In MS-DOS, it was a stub for QBasic running in editor mode. Starting with Windows 95, MS-DOS Editor became a standalone program because QBasic didn't ship with Windows.

The Editor may be used as a substitute for Windows Notepad on Windows 9x, although both are limited to small files only. MS-DOS versions are limited to approximately  depending on how much conventional memory is free. The Editor can edit files that are up to 65,279 lines and up to approximately 5 MB in size.

Versions
The Editor version 1.0 appeared in MS-DOS 5.00, PC DOS 5.0, OS/2, and Windows NT 4.0.  These editors rely on QBasic 1.0. This version can only open one file, to the limit of DOS memory. It can also open the quick help file in a split window. 

The Editor version 1.1 appeared in MS-DOS 6.0. It uses QBasic 1.1 but no new features were added to the Editor.

PC DOS 6 does not include the edit command.  Instead, it has the DOS E Editor.  This was upgraded to support mouse and menus in version of 7.0.

The Editor version 2.0 appeared with Windows 95, as standalone app that no longer requires QBasic. This version has been included with all "x86" SKUs of Windows, until Windows 11. Being a 16-bit DOS app, it does not directly run on x64, IA-64, or ARM64 versions of Windows.

The FreeDOS version was developed by Shaun Raven and is licensed under the GPL.

Features
MS-DOS Editor uses a text user interface and its color scheme can be adjusted.  It has a multiple-document interface in which its version 2.0 (as included in DOS 7 or Windows 9x) can open up to 9 files at a time while earlier versions (included in DOS 5 and 6) are limited to only one file.  The screen can be split vertically into two panes which can be used to view two files simultaneously or different parts of the same file.  It can also open files in binary mode, where a fixed number of characters are displayed per line, with newlines treated like any other character.  This mode shows characters as hexadecimal characters (0-9 and A-F).  Editor converts Unix newlines to DOS newlines and has mouse support.  Some of these features were added only in version 2.0.

References

Further reading

External links

"edit" on Microsoft Docs

DOS software
Windows components
DOS text editors
Console applications
1991 software